Léo Llong (born 22 August 2001) is a French professional rugby league footballer who plays as a  or  for St Estève in the Elite 1 Championship.

In 2022, he made his Catalans debut in the Super League against the Wigan Warriors.

References

External links
Catalans Dragons profile

2001 births
Living people
AS Saint Estève players
Catalans Dragons players
French rugby league players
Rugby league second-rows